Thryptomene hubbardii is a species of flowering plant in the family Myrtaceae and is endemic to a small area in the west of Western Australia. It is a spreading shrub with crowded broadly egg-shaped leaves with the narrower end towards the base, and flowers with five pale pink petals and nine or ten stamens.

Description
Flowering occurs from August to December.

Taxonomy
Thryptomene hubbardii was first formally described in 2014 by Barbara Lynette Rye and Malcolm Eric Trudgen in the journal Nuytsia from specimens collected by near Mullewa by Bronwen and Gregory Keighery in 2004. The specific epithet (hubbardii) honours Richard T. Hubbard, who prepared a detailed but unpublished manuscript for the Myrtaceae of Western Australia.

Distribution and habitat
This thryptomene grows in tall shrubland and mallee woodland from the East Yuna Nature Reserve to Indarra Springs Nature Reserve in the Avon Wheatbelt and Geraldton Sandplains biogeographic regions of Western Australia.

Conservation status
Thryptomene hubbardii is classified as "Priority Two" by the Western Australian Government Department of Parks and Wildlife meaning that it is poorly known and from only one or a few locations.

References

hubbardii
Endemic flora of Western Australia
Rosids of Western Australia
Plants described in 2014
Taxa named by Barbara Lynette Rye
Taxa named by Malcolm Eric Trudgen